Paul M. Healy is an American academic. He is the James R. Williston Professor of Business Administration at Harvard Business School.

Early life
Paul M. Healy graduated from the Victoria University of Wellington in 1977. He earned a PhD from the University of Rochester in 1981.

Career
Healy was a professor at the MIT Sloan School of Management. Since 1998, he has been a professor at the Harvard Business School. He was HBS's second highest paid professor in 2014, when he earned $606,618.

Healy is the co-author of several books.

Selected works

References

Year of birth missing (living people)
Living people
Victoria University of Wellington alumni
University of Rochester alumni
MIT Sloan School of Management faculty
Harvard Business School faculty